Monica Brant (born October 26, 1970) is an IFBB professional figure competitor and a former fitness competitor. Brant won the 1998 Ms. Fitness Olympia. She first appeared on the cover of Muscle & Fitness in November 1994 and has, according to her website, appeared on over 100 international magazine covers.

Biography
She was born in Fort Hood, Texas and raised  on a  ranch in a small town outside of San Antonio called Castroville. Her mother is a professional horse training business. By the time she was 14, she was giving riding lessons and training horses on her own with occasional advice from her mom.  Along with volleyball and track in high school, she competed in many events: western pleasure, barrels and pole bending, English pleasure, dressage, and Hunter/Jumper.

After Monica graduated, her love of horses took her to a fine arts college in Fulton, Missouri, where she studied basics and equestrian science for her first year. Unable to return for further studies in Missouri, Brant took classes at San Antonio College in Texas, and gave riding lessons at nearby stables. She also did promotional work for Budweiser, waitressed, and competed in bikini contests for extra funds.

In 1991, Monica started lifting weights with a friend and saw a photo of Marla Duncan winning a national competition.  Her beauty and physique impressed her enough that she wanted to try what she was doing - Fitness Competitions.
Up until 1995 she only competed for fun, not as a money-making career.  In 1994 she was honored with a Muscle & Fitness cover.  This helped Monica realize that she had potential to earn some actual money in the fitness industry. She kept competing and in April of '95 moved to the Los Angeles area.  Once she arrived, Brant dove into what would become her career and competed in the IFBB organization two to three times per year.

After competing in the Fitness Olympia three times from 1995 to 1997, she won her first and only Olympia title in 1998.

After placing second twice after her 1998 victory, Monica retired from fitness competition citing the demand on gymnastics in order to win were too great for her.

Monica returned to competition in 2003 with the announcement that figure competition would be part of the sport of bodybuilding. After placing 3rd in the 2006 Figure Olympia, Brant decided to take a break from other competitions and focus on the 2007 Olympia.  Monica placed 7th in the 2007 Figure Olympia competition.  However, in September 2010, Monica returned to compete in Figure once again, taking to the WBFF World Pro Championship stage in Toronto.  She took first place at the competition and landed a cover on Oxygen Magazine in January 2011.

In August 2013 Monica Brant retired from Figure competitions, winning the WBFF World Pro Championship for the second time.

Lately she finished at top 3 in all the events where she competed, in 2013 WMA Outdoor Championships (Porto Alegre, Brazil), where she competed in the Women's 100m(2nd place), 200m(3rd place), 400m(3rd place), 4x100m relay(1st place) and 4x400m relay(1st place).

Contest history
1991 Fitness USA Preliminary 1st
1991 Ms. National Fitness 14th
1993 Fitness USA Preliminary 6th
1994 Fitness USA Preliminary 1st
1994 Ms. National Fitness 6th
1995 Fitness USA Nationals 9th
1995 IFBB Jan Tana Pro Fitness 1st
1995 IFBB Fitness Olympia 7th
1996 Fitness International 2nd
1996 IFBB Fitness Olympia 7th
1996 IFBB Night Of Champions 4th
1996 IFBB Jan Tana Pro Fitness 2nd
1998 IFBB Fitness Olympia 1st
1999 IFBB Fitness Olympia 4th
2003 Figure International - 2nd
2003 Figure Olympia - 2nd
2003 Show of Strength Pro Championship, Figure - 2nd
2004 Figure International - 2nd
2004 Figure Olympia - 3rd
2005 Figure International - 2nd
2005 Figure Olympia - 3rd
2005 Sacramento Pro Championships, Figure - 3rd
2005 San Francisco Pro Championships, Figure - 2nd
2006 Figure International - 2nd
2006 Figure Olympia - 3rd
2007 Figure Olympia - 7th
2009 Figure International - 6th
2010 Figure International - 7th
2010 WBFF World Pro Figure Champion - 1st
2013 WBFF World Pro Figure Champion - 1st

See also
List of female fitness & figure competitors

References

External links
Official Site
Monica in competition
Tribute to Monica

1970 births
Living people
Fitness and figure competitors